Syed Nagli  is a town in Amroha district in the Indian state of Uttar Pradesh. It is situated on State Highway 51, around 15 Km from Hasanpur and 19 Km from Sambhal. Syed Nagli has its own post office with PIN code 244242 and a police station.

Geography

Demographics
As of the 2011 Indian Census, the town of Syed Nagli had a total population of 12,160, of which 6,369 were males and 5,791 were females. Population within the age group of 0 to 6 years was 1,972. The total number of literates in Syed Nagli was 6,644, which constituted 54.6% of the population with male literacy of 61.6% and female literacy of 47.0%. The effective literacy rate of 7+ population of Syed Nagli was 65.2%, of which male literacy rate was 73.5% and female literacy rate was 56.1%. The Scheduled Castes population was 1,094. Syed Nagli had 30460 households in 2014.

Transport

Road
Syed Nagli is connected by road to the towns of Sambhal, Hasanpur, Gajraula, Moradabad and Budaun.

Rail
Syed Nagli's nearest railway station is in Gajraula.

Air
Syed Nagli's nearest major airport is Indira Gandhi International Airport, Delhi. It is approximately   via SH 51 and NH24 (AH2).

References

Census of India 2011

Cities and towns in Amroha district

it:Amroha
vi:Amroha
war:Amroha